Niramulla Ravulkal is a 1986 Indian Malayalam film, directed by N. Sankaran Nair and produced by S. Kumar. The film stars Suresh Gopi, Prameela, Unnimary and Vincent in the lead roles. The film has a musical score by K. J. Joy.

Plot
Radha works in a finance company. Her father and stepmother live on her salary. Her father drinks alcohol with Balan Pillai, her mother's lover. The fraud financier tries to rape her, but she escapes, quitting the job. Balan Pillai takes her to town offering a job, and leads her to a brothel. There the inspector takes her chastity. The cruel brothel owner beats the inmates. Peter, a thief, helps her escape. Ravunni takes her in disguise of vigilance. Ravunni keeps a polished brothel. Sarada, a village girl, comes to this house to take her home. Once she tells her mother about her job. then they do not allow her to join in her sister's marriage. She commits suicide. Radha loses hope that her lover will accept her. She desires to remain in the job. Radha joins company with contractor Peethambaran. There she meets excise commissioner Sudevan and MLA Kumaran.  Peethambaran treats minister with a girl, but it was his own daughter. He kills her and tries to make it look like a suicide. Radha frees a girl from attackers and helps her to reach home. It was Balan Pillai's house. He was paralyzed. He confesses. The inspector also confesses in his deeds to Radha. The inspector takes Peethambaran into custody. Her lover comes to accept her, but she takes poison.

Cast

 Vincent - Financier
 Ashwathy - Radha
 Shubha - Radha's mother
 Sathaar - Balan Pilla
 Achankunju - Sreedran Pilla (Radha's father)
 Bheeman Raghu - Police Inspector who violates Radha's virginity as her first client at brothel
 Jagathy Sreekumar - Vigilence / Ravunni
 Devan - Radha's lover
 Poojappura Ravi - Peter
 Lalithasree - Meeramma (Brothel Madam)
 Soorya - Sarada 
Bhagyalakshmi (actress) (Sarada's Sister)
 Bahadoor - Sarada's father
 Suresh Gopi - Customer who gets to pop Sarada's cherry
 Prameela - Ravunnis's wife
 Unnimary - a Call Girl
 Thodupuzha Vasanthi - Sarada's mother
 Jose Prakash - Excise Commissioner Sudevan
 Prathapachandran
 Janardanan - MLA Kumaran
 Kundara Johnny - Contractor Peethambaran
 Saleema - Contractor Peethambaran's daughter

Soundtrack
The music was composed by K. J. Joy and the lyrics were written by Poovachal Khader.

References

External links
 
 Niramulla Ravukal - YouTube

1986 films
1980s Malayalam-language films
Films directed by N. Sankaran Nair